J. C. Chan may refer to:

Jean Chan-Chiang, Canadian sledge hockey player
Jaycee Chan, American-Hong Kong actor and singer